Nina, ou La folle par amour (Nina, or The Woman Crazed with Love) is an opéra-comique in one act by the French composer Nicolas Dalayrac. It was first performed on 15 May 1786 by the Comédie-Italienne at the first Salle Favart in Paris. The libretto, by Benoît-Joseph Marsollier des Vivetières, is based on a short story by Baculard d'Arnaud.

Background and performance history

Nina was Dalayrac's first collaboration with Marsollier des Vivetières, who would go on to write many more librettos for him, including Les deux petits savoyards. Revived by the Opéra-Comique at the Salle Feydeau in July 1802, Nina was a popular success, which it remained until receiving its last performance by the company in 1852. It was also performed in translation in London and Hamburg in 1787 and in Italy in 1788.

Its most famous aria, "Quand le bien-aimé reviendra" ("When my sweetheart returns to me"), is mentioned by Hector Berlioz in his Memoirs as his "first musical experience" (he heard an adaptation of the melody sung during his First Communion).

In 1813 Dalayrac's score for Nina was adapted as a ballet by Louis Milon and Louis-Luc Loiseau de Persuis with Émilie Bigottini in the title role. In the ballet version, "Quand le bien-aimé reviendra" is played as a solo for cor anglais. It was at one of the early performances of this ballet that Berlioz remembered the melody he had heard in his childhood.

Giovanni Paisiello had also set the libretto in an Italian version adapted by Giambattista Lorenzi. Paisiello's Nina, which premiered in 1789 is still performed today, while Dalayrac's has fallen into obscurity.

Roles

Synopsis
Nina is in love with Germeuil but her father, Count Lindoro, favours another suitor. Germeuil and his rival fight a duel. Nina believes that Germeuil has been killed and goes mad, forgetting aspects of the traumatic incident in a manner consistent with a diagnosis of psychogenic amnesia. She only regains her reason when Germeuil reappears unharmed and her father finally allows him to marry her.

Recordings
Although there are no full-length recordings of Nina, its most famous aria, "Quand le bien-aimé reviendra", can be heard on Serate Musicali (Joan Sutherland (soprano), Richard Bonynge (piano), Decca, 2006)

In popular culture
The opera is referenced by name and synopsis in Episode 5, Season 4 of the science fiction series Stranger Things.  Incongruously, this reference is accompanied by the playing of an aria, Il mio ben quando verrà (When my beloved comes), from Giovanni Paisiello's opera of parallel name, year, and subject.

References

Sources
Original libretto: Nina, ou la Folle par amour, Comédie en un acte, en prose, mêlée d'ariettes, Paris, Brunet, 1786 (accessible for free online as a Google ebook-gratis)
Original printed score: Nina, ou la Folle par amour, Comédie en un acte, en prose, Paris, Le Duc, s.d. (accessible for free on-line at Internet Archives)
The Viking Opera Guide ed. Holden (Viking, 1993)
 Campardon, Émile (ed), Les Comédiens du roi de la troupe italienne pendant les deux derniers siècles: documents inédits recueillis aux Archives Nationales, Paris, Berger-Levrault, 1880 (accessible for free online at Internet Archive: Volume I (A-L); Volume II (M-Z)) 
 Charlton, David (1992), 'Nina, ou La folle par amour' in The New Grove Dictionary of Opera, ed. Stanley Sadie (London) 
 Wild, Nicole; Charlton, David (2005). Théâtre de l'Opéra-Comique Paris: répertoire 1762-1972. Sprimont, Belgium: Editions Mardaga. .

External links

Libretto in the original French.

1786 operas
French-language operas
Operas
One-act operas
Opera world premieres at the Opéra-Comique
Operas by Nicolas Dalayrac
Opéras comiques